"Seth & Fiona" is a 1994 Dutch TV series.

Plot summary

Cast 
Paul de Leeuw as Seth
Olga Zuiderhoek as Fiona (11 episodes, 1994)
Kees Prins as Freek
Joep Onderdelinden as Roel
Cor Bakker
Kees Hulst as Jos

External links 

1994 Dutch television series debuts
1990s Dutch television series
1994 Dutch television series endings